Poomangalam  is a village in Thrissur district in the state of Kerala, India.

Demographics
 India census, Poomangalam had a population of 10607 with 4879 males and 5728 females.

References

Villages in Mukundapuram Taluk